"Horseshoes" is a song recorded by Canadian country music artist Adam Gregory. It was released in 2000 as the first single from his debut album, The Way I'm Made. It peaked at number 2 on the RPM Country Tracks chart in July 2000. In 2001 it was named by SOCAN as one of the most performed Canadian country songs.

Chart performance

References

2000 songs
Adam Gregory songs
Epic Records singles
2000 debut singles